Joshua Ramsey (born August 22, 2002) is an American professional soccer player who plays as a defender for USL Championship side San Antonio FC.

Club career
Ramsey played with the USSDA academy side Solar SC from 2015, before signing an academy contract with USL Championship side San Antonio FC on March 3, 2020.

Career statistics

Club

References

External links
Profile at the USL Championship website

2002 births
Living people
American soccer players
Association football defenders
People from Plano, Texas
San Antonio FC players
Soccer players from Texas
United States men's youth international soccer players
USL Championship players